Mulan Rural District is in the Central District of Kaleybar County, East Azerbaijan province, Iran. At the National Census of 2006, its population was 5,785 in 1,242 households. There were 4,897 inhabitants in 1,304 households at the following census of 2011. At the most recent census of 2016, the population of the rural district was 4,001 in 1,311 households. The largest of its 30 villages was Qayah Bashi-ye Bozorg, with 1,456 people.

References 

Kaleybar County

Rural Districts of East Azerbaijan Province

Populated places in East Azerbaijan Province

Populated places in Kaleybar County